The 15th government of Turkey (7 August 1946 – 10 September 1947) was a government in the history of Turkey. It is also called the Peker government.

Background 
Although Republican People's Party (CHP) won the elections held on 21 July, prime minister Şükrü Saracoğlu of CHP announced that he would not continue for another term of premiership due to health problems. Recep Peker, who was the Minister of Interior in Saracoğlu government, was assigned to form the government.

The government
In the list below, the  cabinet members who served only a part of the cabinet's lifespan are shown in the column "Notes".

Aftermath
Following a harsh discussions in the parliament between Recep Peker and Adnan Menderes of the Democrat Party, Recep Peker resigned.

References

Cabinets of Turkey
Republican People's Party (Turkey) politicians
1946 establishments in Turkey
1947 disestablishments in Turkey
Cabinets established in 1946
Cabinets disestablished in 1947
Members of the 15th government of Turkey
8th parliament of Turkey
Republican People's Party (Turkey)